Pijushkanti Mukherjee Mahavidyalaya, is the government aided degree college in Sonapur,  Alipurduar district.  It offers undergraduate courses in arts. It is affiliated to University of North Bengal.

See also

References

External links
Pijushkanti Mukherjee Mahavidyalaya
University of North Bengal
University Grants Commission
National Assessment and Accreditation Council

Universities and colleges in Alipurduar district
Colleges affiliated to University of North Bengal
2015 establishments in West Bengal
Educational institutions established in 2016